Machalí is a Chilean commune and city in Cachapoal Province, O'Higgins Region.

Demographics
Of these, 26,852 (93.8%) lived in urban areas and 1,776 (6.2%) in rural areas. The population grew by 18.5% (4,476 persons) between the 1992 and 2002 censuses.

Administration
As a commune, Machalí is a third-level administrative division of Chile administered by a municipal council, headed by an alcalde who is directly elected every four years. The 2008-2012 alcalde is José Miguel Urrutia.

Within the electoral divisions of Chile, Machalí is represented in the Chamber of Deputies by Eugenio Bauer (UDI) and Ricardo Rincón  (PDC) as part of the 33rd electoral district, together with Mostazal, Graneros, Codegua, Requínoa, Rengo, Olivar, Doñihue, Coinco, Coltauco, Quinta de Tilcoco and Malloa. The commune is represented in the Senate by Andrés Chadwick Piñera (UDI) and Juan Pablo Letelier Morel (PS) as part of the 9th senatorial constituency (O'Higgins Region).

References

External links
  Municipality of Machalí

Communes of Chile
Populated places in Cachapoal Province